Harry Albert Atwater, Jr. is an American physicist and materials scientist and is the Otis Booth Leadership Chair of the Division of Engineering and Applied Science at the California Institute of Technology. Currently he is the Howard Hughes Professor of Applied Physics and Materials Science and the Director for the Liquid Sunlight Alliance (LiSA), a Department of Energy Hub program for solar fuels.  Atwater's scientific effort focuses on nanophotonic light-matter interactions and solar energy conversion.  His current research in energy centers on high efficiency photovoltaics, carbon capture and removal, and photoelectrochemical processes for generation of solar fuels. His research has resulted in world records for solar photovoltaic conversion and photoelectrochemical water splitting. His work also spans fundamental nanophotonic phenomena, in plasmonics and 2D materials, and also applications including active metasurfaces and optical propulsion.  

From 2014 to 2020, Atwater served as Director of the Joint Center for Artificial Photosynthesis (JCAP), the DOE Energy Innovation Hub for solar fuels.   Atwater was an early pioneer in nanophotonics and plasmonics; he gave the name to the field of plasmonics in 2001.  Atwater is a Member of US National Academy of Engineering, and a Web of Science Highly Cited Researcher.  He is also founder of 5 early-stage companies, including Captura, which is developing scalable approaches to carbon dioxide removal from oceanwater, and Alta Devices, which set world records for photovoltaic cell and module efficiency. He is also a Fellow of the SPIE as well as APS, MRS, Optica, and the National Academy of Inventors. He is also the founding Editor in Chief of the journal ACS Photonics, and Chair of the LightSail Committee for the Breakthrough Starshot program. He is the recipient of numerous awards, including the 2021 von Hippel Award of the Materials Research Society.

Biography
Atwater received his S.B. (1981), S.M. (1983), and Ph.D. (1987) in electrical engineering from the Massachusetts Institute of Technology. He serves as Director of the DOE Energy Frontier Research Center on Light-Material Interactions in Solar Energy Conversion and was named Director of the Resnick Institute for Science, Energy and Sustainability, Caltech's largest endowed research program focused on energy.  Atwater is founder and chief technical advisor for Alta Devices, a venture-backed company in Santa Clara, CA developing a transformational high efficiency/low cost photovoltaics technology, and Aonex Corporation, a compound semiconductor materials company.  He has also served an editorial board member for Surface Review and Letters.  Professor Atwater has actively served the materials community in various capacities, including Materials Research Society Meeting Chair (1997), Materials Research Society President (2000), AVS Electronic Materials and Processing Division Chair (1999), and Board of Trustees of the Gordon Research Conferences.  In 2008, he served as Chair for the Gordon Research Conference on Plasmonics. Since 2014, he has served as the editor-in-chief of the journal ACS Photonics, published by the American Chemical Society. In 2015, Atwater was elected as a member into the National Academy of Engineering for his contributions to plasmonics.

Research

Atwaters research interests center around two interwoven research themes: photovoltaics and solar energy; and plasmonics and optical metamaterials.  Atwater and his group have been active in photovoltaics research for more than 20 years. Together, aAtwater and his group have created new photovoltaic devices, including the silicon wire array solar cell, and layer-transferred fabrication approaches to III-V semiconductor III-V and multijunction cells, as well as making advances in plasmonic light absorber structures for III-V compound and silicon thin films.  His research group's developments in the solar and plasmonics fields have been featured in Scientific American and in research papers such as Science, Nature Materials, Nature Photonics and Advanced Materials.

Recently, his research has explanded to include the study of artificial photosynthesis to design fully-integrated photoelectrochemical (PEC) device for the production of renewable fuels. Additionally, Atwater's group is currently investigating the distinctive material characteristics of graphene as they relate to plasmonics that can be adjusted. Through the process of designing Fabry-Perot nanoresonators (small optical structures that consist of two parallel mirrors or reflectors separated by a nanoscale gap) onto a graphene sheet that has been doped and patterned, the Atwater group aims to observe a plasmonic resonance that changes in accordance with the size of the resonator.

Awards 
Atwater is an MRS Fellow and has been honored by awards including the 2021 Von Hippel Award from the Materials Research Society; 2012 ENI award for Renewable and Non-Conventional Energy; MRS Kavli Lecturer in Nanoscience in 2010; Popular Mechanics Breakthrough Award, 2010; Joop Los Fellowship from the Dutch Society for Fundamental Research on Matter in 2005,  A.T. & T. Foundation Award, 1990; NSF Presidential Young Investigator Award, 1989; IBM Faculty Development Award, 1989–1990; Member, Bohmische Physical Society, 1990; IBM Postdoctoral Fellowship, 1987. He is a member of the National Academy of Engineering.

Selected publications 
 Enright, Michael J.; Jasrasaria, Dipti; Hanchard, Mathilde M.; Needell, David R.; Phelan, Megan E.; Weinberg, Daniel; McDowell, Brinn E.; Hsiao, Haw-Wen; Akbari, Hamidreza; Kottwitz, Matthew; Potter, Maggie M.; Wong, Joeson; Zuo, Jian-Min; Atwater, Harry A.; Rabani, Eran (2022-05-05). "Role of Atomic Structure on Exciton Dynamics and Photoluminescence in NIR Emissive InAs/InP/ZnSe Quantum Dots". The Journal of Physical Chemistry C. 126 (17): 7576–7587. doi:10.1021/acs.jpcc.2c01499. ISSN 1932-7447
 Sullivan, Ian; Goryachev, Andrey; Digdaya, Ibadillah A.; Li, Xueqian; Atwater, Harry A.; Vermaas, David A.; Xiang, Chengxiang (November 2021). "Coupling electrochemical CO2 conversion with CO2 capture". Nature Catalysis. 4 (11): 952–958. doi:10.1038/s41929-021-00699-7. ISSN 2520-1158
 Digdaya, Ibadillah A.; Sullivan, Ian; Lin, Meng; Han, Lihao; Cheng, Wen-Hui; Atwater, Harry A.; Xiang, Chengxiang (2020-09-04). "A direct coupled electrochemical system for capture and conversion of CO2 from oceanwater". Nature Communications. 11 (1): 4412. doi:10.1038/s41467-020-18232-y. ISSN 2041-1723
 Ilic, Ognjen; Atwater, Harry A. (2019-04). "Self-stabilizing photonic levitation and propulsion of nanostructured macroscopic objects". Nature Photonics. 13 (4): 289–295. doi:10.1038/s41566-019-0373-y. ISSN 1749-4893
 R. Shaner, Matthew; A. Atwater, Harry; S. Lewis, Nathan; W. McFarland, Eric (2016). "A comparative technoeconomic analysis of renewable hydrogen production using solar energy". Energy & Environmental Science. 9 (7): 2354–2371. doi:10.1039/C5EE02573G
 Callahan, Dennis M.; Munday, Jeremy N.; Atwater, Harry A. (2012-01-11). "Solar Cell Light Trapping beyond the Ray Optic Limit". Nano Letters. 12 (1): 214–218. doi:10.1021/nl203351k. ISSN 1530-6984
 Yokogawa, Sozo; Burgos, Stanley P.; Atwater, Harry A. (2012-08-08). "Plasmonic Color Filters for CMOS Image Sensor Applications". Nano Letters. 12 (8): 4349–4354. doi:10.1021/nl302110z. ISSN 1530-6984.
 Aydin, Koray; Ferry, Vivian E.; Briggs, Ryan M.; Atwater, Harry A. (2011). "Broadband polarization-independent resonant light absorption using ultrathin plasmonic super absorbers." Nature Communications. 2 (1): 517.
 
 
 Ferry, Vivian E.; Munday, Jeremy N.; Atwater, Harry A. (2010-11-16). "Design Considerations for Plasmonic Photovoltaics". Advanced Materials. 22 (43): 4794–4808. doi:10.1002/adma.201000488
 Ferry, Vivian E.; Verschuuren, Marc A.; Li, Hongbo B. T.; Verhagen, Ewold; Walters, Robert J.; Schropp, Ruud E. I.; Atwater, Harry A.; Polman, Albert (2010-06-21). "Light trapping in ultrathin plasmonic solar cells". Optics Express. 18 (102): A237–A245. doi:10.1364/OE.18.00A237. ISSN 1094-4087.
 Dionne, Jennifer A.; Diest, Kenneth; Sweatlock, Luke A.; Atwater, Harry A. (2009-02-11). "PlasMOStor: A Metal−Oxide−Si Field Effect Plasmonic Modulator". Nano Letters. 9 (2): 897–902. doi:10.1021/nl803868k. ISSN 1530-6984.
 Ferry, Vivian E.; Sweatlock, Luke A.; Pacifici, Domenico; Atwater, Harry A. (2008-12-10). "Plasmonic Nanostructure Design for Efficient Light Coupling into Solar Cells". Nano Letters. 8 (12): 4391–4397. doi:10.1021/nl8022548. ISSN 1530-6984.
 
 
 
 Atwater, Harry A. (2007). "The Promise of PLASMONICS". Scientific American. 296 (4): 56–63. ISSN 0036-8733.

References

External links/sources 
Atwater's profile at Caltech
Atwater Research Group Website
Light-Material Interactions in Energy Conversion Energy Frontier Research Center
Resnick Institute
ENI Award homepage
Harry A. Atwater: SPIE Photonics West plenary presentation: Tunable and Quantum Metaphotonics

MIT School of Engineering alumni
California Institute of Technology faculty
Living people
Year of birth missing (living people)
20th-century American physicists
American electrical engineers
American materials scientists
Members of the United States National Academy of Engineering
Optical physicists
Optical engineers
Metamaterials scientists
American nanotechnologists
21st-century American physicists
20th-century American engineers
21st-century American engineers
Fellows of the American Physical Society